Pseudolaureola atlantica, or the Spiky Yellow Woodlouse is a species of woodlouse endemic to St. Helena's High Peak.

Unlike woodlice that forage on the forest floor, the spiky yellow woodlouse inhabits the treetops of Tree fern thickets and Black Cabbage tree woodland, as well as black scale fern groves, found on Peaks National Park. They have also been recorded inhabiting St. Helena redwood trees.

Its numbers are in decline due to introduced species such as rats and competition with foreign woodlice. Large scale flax farming is decimating the now-reduced black cabbage tree groves that it inhabits. A captive breeding program was attempted but failed because of their need for very precise conditions,their focus has now changed from captive breeding to preservation of habitat.
 Currently, there are approximately 100 known individuals on the island, after the discovery of approximately 40 to 100 individuals.

The Spiky Yellow Woodlouse probably feeds on spores and pollen.

The Spiky Yellow Woodlouse is 1 centimeter long. It is bright yellow and covered in spines, and it has no visual dimorphism between the sexes. Its bright coloration and spines are likely used to ward off potential predators it may encounter.

References

Woodlice